Dany Bill (born 28 April 1973) is a Cameroonian former kickboxer and seven-time Muay Thai World Champion.

Biography
When growing up as a kid in France Dany used to play soccer, but the day he saw muay thai on TV changed his life. Right after that, in 1986, he began to train at Nemrod Boxing Gym (La Cité du Clos Saint Lazare) in his hometown Stains (93).

Dany Bill had his first fight at the age of 14 and became the French Muay Thai Champion in 1988 when he was only 15 years old.

In 1993, he was the first European fighter to win the World Title in Thailand against Den Muang Surin. This took place during the King's Birthday Event in Bangkok.
	
He was World Champion for seven consecutive years, from 1993 to 1999, defeating all the best fighters in the world such as Nokweed Devy, Pananonlek, Saimai Suk, Orono Por Muang U bon, Joel Cesar, Joe Prestia.

He lost his World Title in 1999 against Sakmongkol Sithchuchok. After that he fought at the King's Birthday in 2000 in Thailand. Then lost again against Kaolan Kaovichit. He then retired from muay thai for 2 years before making his comeback in 2003 against Aurelien Duarte. During, the match he suffered a leg injury in the 2nd round and lost the fight by TKO.

In 2006, Dany Bill made his second comeback in the European kickboxing fighting circuit, Superleague. On his first fight back he won against Moises Baptista de Souza  and then beat Roberto Cocco from Italy by unanimous decision.

Dany Bill is now a Muay Thai Trainer.

Titles
1993 - 1999 : 7 time World Muay Thai Champion
1990 French Senior Muay Thai Champion
1989 French Junior Muay Thai Champion
1988 French Cadet Muay Thai Champion

Fight record

|- bgcolor="#FFBBBB"
| 2011-05-21 || Loss || align=left| Hicham El Gaoui || Le Choc Des Legéndes || Saint Ouen, France || Decision (Unanimous) || 3 || 3:00
|- bgcolor="#CCFFCC"
| 2006-03-11 || Win || align=left| Roberto Cocco || SuperLeague Apocalypse 2006 || Paris, France || Decision (Unanimous) || 3 || 3:00
|- bgcolor="#CCFFCC"
| 2006-01-28 || Win || align=left| Moises Baptisa De Souza || SuperLeague Hungary 2006 || Budapest, Hungary || Decision (Unanimous) || 3 || 3:00
|- bgcolor="#FFBBBB"
| 2003-10-25 || Loss || align=left| Aurelien Duarte || Apocalypse 2003 || France || TKO (Tibia fracture) || 2 || 
|- bgcolor="#FFBBBB"
| 2000-12-05 || Loss || align=left| Kaolan Kaovichit || King's Birthday Event || Bangkok, Thailand || Decision (Unanimous) || 5 || 3:00
|- bgcolor="#cfc"
| 2000-05-20 || Win || align=left| Kenglai Sor Vorapin || France Thaïlande || France || TKO || 2 || 
|- bgcolor="#FFBBBB"
|- bgcolor="#CCFFCC"
| 1998-12-05 || Win || align=left| Sangtiennoi Sor.Rungroj || King's Birthday Event || Bangkok, Thailand || Decision (Unanimous) || 5 || 3:00
|- bgcolor="#CCFFCC"
| 1998- || Win || align=left| Orono Por Muang Ubon || || Paris, France || Decision (Unanimous) || 5 || 3:00
|- bgcolor="#CCFFCC"
| 1998-05-23 || Win || align=left| Kamal L'marzguiou || Muay Thai Champions League Part II || Roosendaal, Netherlands || KO || 4 || 
|- bgcolor="#CCFFCC"
| ? || Win || align=left| Dendanai Ekawit || Lumpinee Stadium || Bangkok, Thailand || Decision || 5 || 3:00
|- bgcolor="#CCFFCC"
| 1997-12-05 || Win || align=left| Orono Por Muang Ubon || King's Birthday || Bangkok, Thailand || Decision (Unanimous) || 5 || 3:00
|- bgcolor="#CCFFCC"
| 1997-11-22 || Win || align=left| Ramon Dekkers || King of the Ring || Paris, France || Decision (Unanimous) || 5 || 3:00
|- bgcolor="#fbb"
| 1997-10-25 || Loss || align=left| Vichan Chorrotchai || MAJKF || Bunkyo, Tokyo, Japan || Decision (Unanimous) || 5 || 3:00
|- bgcolor="#fbb"
| 1997-10-05 || Loss || align=left| Sakmongkol Sithchuchok || || Paris, France || Decision (Split) || 5 || 3:00
|-
! style=background:white colspan=9 |
|- bgcolor="#CCFFCC"
| 1997-09- || Win || align=left| Peter Kley || || Prague, Czech Republic || Decision || 5 || 3:00
|- bgcolor="#CCFFCC"
| 1997-05-09 || Win || align=left| Kenichi Ogata || S-Cup 1997, Super Fight || Shibuya, Tokyo, Japan || TKO (Corner Stoppage) || 5 || 1:42
|- bgcolor="#cfc"
| 1997-02-01 || Win || align=left| Nongmoon Chomputong || Le Choc Des Champions || Gagny, France || TKO (Doctor Stoppage) || 4 || 
|-
! style=background:white colspan=9 |
|- bgcolor="#fbb"
| 1996-11-16 || Loss || align=left| Samart Kayadisorn || Onesongchai, Lumpinee Stadium || Bangkok, Thailand || Decision || 5 || 3:00
|- bgcolor="#FFBBBB"
| 1996-07-14 || Loss || align=left| Hassan Kassrioui || S-Cup 1996, Opening Round || Kōtō, Tokyo, Japan || Ext.R Decision (Unanimous) || 4 || 3:00
|-
|- bgcolor="#CCFFCC"
| ? || Win || align=left| Eval Denton || || Paris France || TKO (Low Kicks and punches) || 4 || 
|- bgcolor="#fbb"
| 1995-12-05 || Loss || align=left| Sangtiennoi Sor.Rungroj || King's Birthday Event || Bangkok, Thailand || Decision || 5 || 3:00
|- bgcolor="#CCFFCC"
| 1995-11-17 || Win || align=left| Jo Prestia || || Levallois-Perret, France || Decision (Unanimous) || 5 || 3:00
|-
! style=background:white colspan=9 |
|- bgcolor="#CCFFCC"
| 1995- || Win || align=left| Panomrunglek Chor Siwat || Lumpinee Stadium || Bangkok, Thailand || Decision (Unanimous) || 5 || 3:00
|- bgcolor="#CCFFCC"
| 1995-08-27 || Win || align=left| Samaisuk Sakmuang || || Austria || Decision (Unanimous) || 5 || 3:00
|- bgcolor="#CCFFCC"
| 1995-05-07 || Win || align=left| Ronnie Lewis || Shoot Boxing "Battle Rave vol.3"|| Tokyo, Japan || Ext.R Decision || 4 || 3:00
|- bgcolor="#CCFFCC"
| 1995-03-15 || Win || align=left| Dylan Gravenberg || Palais Omnisport de Thiais || Thiais, France || Decision (Unanimous) || 5 || 3:00
|-
! style=background:white colspan=9 |
|- bgcolor="#cfc"
| ? || Win || align=left| Joel Cesar || || France || Decision (Unanimous) || 5 || 3:00
|- bgcolor="#cfc"
| ? || Win || align=left| Joel Cesar || || France || Decision || 5 || 3:00
|- bgcolor="#cfc"
| ? || Win || align=left| Vichan Chorrotchai || Cirque d'hiver || Paris, France || Decision (Unanimous) || 5 || 3:00
|- bgcolor="#CCFFCC"
| ? || Win || align=left| Mangonjuk || || Paris, France || Decision (Unanimous) || 5 || 3:00
|-
! style=background:white colspan=9 |
|- bgcolor="#CCFFCC"
| 1994-12-05 || Win || align=left| Sayidkhan Kiatpathan || King's Birthday Event || Bangkok, Thailand || Decision (Unanimous) || 5 || 3:00
|-
! style=background:white colspan=9 |

|- bgcolor="#cfc"
| 1994-09-20 || Win|| align=left| Nokweed Devy ||  || Bangkok, Thailand || Decision (Unanimous) || 5 || 3:00
|-
! style=background:white colspan=9 |
|- bgcolor="#CCFFCC"
| 1994 ? || Win || align=left| Pananonlek || Lumpinee Stadium || Bangkok, Thailand || Decision (Unanimous) || 5 || 3:00
|- bgcolor="#FFBBBB"
| 1994-08-03 || Loss || align=left| Coban Lookchaomaesaitong || Lumpinee Stadium || Bangkok, Thailand || Decision || 5 || 3:00
|-
|- bgcolor="#FFBBBB"
| 1994 || Loss || align=left| Nordin Ben Salah || || Amsterdam, Netherlands || Decision (Unanimous) || 5 || 3:00

|-
|- bgcolor="#CCFFCC"
| 1993-12-05 || Win || align=left| Den Muangsurin || King's Birthday Event || Bangkok, Thailand || Decision || 5 || 3:00
|-
! style=background:white colspan=9 |
|-
|- bgcolor="#CCFFCC"
| 1993 || Win || align=left| Eduardo Ezquerra || || Spain || KO (High Kick) || 1 || 
|- bgcolor="#fbb"
| 1992 || Loss || align=left| Nongmoon Chomputong || || || Decision || 5 || 3:00 
|-
! style=background:white colspan=9 |
|- bgcolor="#CCFFCC"
| 1992 || Win || align=left| Fred Klose || || France || Decision || 5 || 3:00
|- bgcolor="#CCFFCC"
| 1992 || Win || align=left| Samarth GalaxyGym || || Paris, France || Decision || 5 || 3:00
|-
| colspan=9 | Legend:

See also
List of male kickboxers

References

External links
Best K-1 Website on the net
Dany Bill's Official Site

1973 births
Living people
Cameroonian male kickboxers
French male kickboxers
Middleweight kickboxers
Cameroonian Muay Thai practitioners
French Muay Thai practitioners
Sportspeople from Douala
Cameroonian emigrants to France
Muay Thai trainers